Lakhanpahari is a village of Godda district. 
Near Lakhanpahari, Maa Yogni and Mnokamna Nath are tourist places. Pradeep Singh is our Mukhiya. He won the Mukhiya election in 2016.

Nature of Lakhanpahari 

The area of Lakhanpahari is surrounded with hills.

Notable people

Pradeep Singh
He is Mukhiya of Lakhanpahari. He was selected in 2016. He is honorable for Lakhanpahari.

Priyam Kashyap
He is representing Lakhanpahari on social media.

Binod Yadav
He is a social worker.

Nand Kishore Jha
Police head constable as well as social worker.

References

External links
 

Villages in Godda district